Flynn Creek Circus is a theatrical circus company operated out of Mendocino County, California. Directed by Blaze Birge and David Jones, also known as the Daring Jones Duo, who perform intricate aerial acts on ropes, trapeze, and aerial silks. Flynn Creek Circus was founded by Blaze Birge and Nick Schwart in 2002. Flynn Creek Circus helped start the Mendocino Center for Circus Arts and the Mendocino Dance Project.

Tours

2014

Show
'Under the Big Top'

Performers
 Changes by season, some past notable performers include: Kris and Harrison Kremo, Amelia Van Brunt, Off Axis, Shem Biggie, Terry Crane, Daredevil Chicken, Selyna Bogina, Florent Lestage, Marianna DeSanctis, Anjo Bem Souza and many more
Daring Jones Duo act Blaze BirgeDavid Jones

2015

Show
'Flynn Creek Circus Tour'

2015 Cast and Crew
David Jones
Blaze Birge
Faeble Kievman
Rebekah Cavinder
Maria Forster
Ajah Leas
Kara Morris
Goulia Rozyeva
Jan Damm
Ariele Ebacher
Kai Newstead
Tyler Beale
Frederick Andersen
Florian Basmajian
Nick Harden
Wendy Harden
Nelson Pivaral
Sasha Pivaral

2016

Cast and Crew
Selyna Bogino Martin
Dany Bogino Martin
Terry Crane
Erica Rubenstein
Jake Hawkins
Ross Travis
Miles Stapp
Luke Peiper
Shem Biggie
Nicole Laumb
Florian Basmajian
Frederick Andersen
Alan Uhlmansiek
Tyler Beale
Blaze Birge
Jacy Jones
David Jones
Duo Madrona
Daring Jones Duo actBlaze BirgeDavid Jones

2017

Show
Inter-Active

Cast and Crew
Duo Have a Ball
Daring Jones DuoBlaze BirgeDavid Jones
Ross Travis
Amelia van Brunt
Sasha Pivaral
Passion 2 Balance
Ariele Ebacher
Jan Damm
Miles Stapp
Shem Biggie
Nicole Laumb
Tyler Beale
Frederick Andersen
Maya deLoche
Max Newstead
Fleeky

2018

Show
Adrift

Cast and crew
Daring Jones Duo Blaze BirgeDavid Jones
Amelia Van Brunt
Florent Lestage
Mariana De Sanctis
Anjo Bem Zouza
Off Axis AcrobaticsTanner MarkleyMax JayDylan Broadway
Shem Biggie
The Sirens  Maya deLoche  Jenavieve Snyder
Claire Horner-Richardson
Virgil Rodriguez
Nicole Laumb
Frederick Andersen
Tyler Beale
David Wager

2019

Show
'Out Of Hat'

Cast
Kris Kremo
Harrison Kremo
Daring Jones Duo  Blaze Birge David Jones
Amelia Van Brunt
Off Axis Acrobatics Max JayRob Demshki
Shem Biggie
A Unicycle Built for 2 Nick HardenWendy Harden
2 Headed GirlMaya DelocheJenavieve Dance
Frederick Andersen
Vivienne Keene
Jacy Jones
David Wagar
Nicole Laumb
Lia Miyamura
Miles McKenty
Kalei Yamanoha
Zak Garn
Dan McDonnell

References

External links
 Official Website

Circuses